David Gilmour in Concert is a DVD of  Pink Floyd guitarist David Gilmour's solo concert that took place at the Royal Festival Hall, London in June 2001, as part of the Robert Wyatt-curated Meltdown festival. It also features footage filmed during three concerts at the same venue in January 2002. The track selection includes several Pink Floyd songs, in addition to Gilmour's solo works. Guest appearances are made by Floyd colleague Richard Wright, as well as Robert Wyatt and Bob Geldof. It includes the first performance of "Smile", a track that would appear almost five years later on Gilmour's third solo album, On an Island. Gilmour also plays two Syd Barrett songs.

Also included is "" ("I still believe I hear") – an aria from Georges Bizet's opera  (The Pearl Fishers) – with a libretto by Eugène Cormon and Michel Carré.  Sung by Gilmour in the original French. "I remember my wife Polly's face going red when I tried singing it," he recalled, "and my face literally going into a cold sweat – 'Do I dare try this?' But once the choir came up here [Gilmour's studio] and ran through it with me, that gave me a huge amount of confidence."

Track listing

The Meltdown Concert from June 2001
"Shine On You Crazy Diamond (Parts I–V)" (David Gilmour, Roger Waters, Richard Wright)
"Terrapin" (Syd Barrett)
"Fat Old Sun" (Gilmour)
"Coming Back to Life" (Gilmour)
"High Hopes" (Gilmour, Polly Samson)
"" (Georges Bizet)
"Smile" (Gilmour, Samson)
"Wish You Were Here" (Gilmour, Waters)
"Comfortably Numb" (with Robert Wyatt) (Gilmour, Waters)
"Dimming of the Day" (Richard Thompson)
"Shine On You Crazy Diamond (Parts VI–VIII)" (Gilmour, Waters, Wright)
"A Great Day for Freedom" (Gilmour, Samson)
"Hushabye Mountain" (Robert B. Sherman, Richard M. Sherman)

Royal Festival Hall Concert 2002
"Dominoes" (Barrett)
"Breakthrough" (with Richard Wright) (Wright, Anthony Moore)
"Comfortably Numb" (with Bob Geldof) (Gilmour, Waters)

Personnel
David Gilmour – guitars, vocals
Neill MacColl – guitars, backing vocals
Michael Kamen – piano, English horn
Chucho Merchán – double bass
Caroline Dale – cello
Dick Parry – baritone and tenor saxophones
Nic France – drums & percussion
Gospel Choir – Sam Brown (choir leader), Chris Ballin, Pete Brown, Margo Buchanan, Claudia Fontaine, Michelle John Douglas, Sonia Jones, Carol Kenyon, David Laudat, Durga McBroom, Aitch McRobbie (solo on Smile), Beverly Skeete
with
Bob Geldof – vocals on "Comfortably Numb" (January 2002 footage)
Robert Wyatt – vocals on "Comfortably Numb" (June 2001 footage)
Richard Wright – vocals on "Breakthrough", keyboards on "Breakthrough" and "Comfortably Numb"

Special features
The 30 minutes of special features on the DVD include the tracks "I Put a Spell on You" (from Later with Jools Holland from June 1992), "Don't" (from a Leiber-Stoller Tribute concert from June 2001), and a performance of Shakespeare's Sonnet 18 (recorded on Gilmour's houseboat The Astoria). Additionally, there is a version of "High Hopes" performed by Gilmour's backing vocalists. Finally, there are lyrics, a home movie of the band and choir rehearsing at home, and a 'Spare Digits' feature - a camera on Gilmour's fretboards during six guitar solos.

Quotes

Charts

Weekly charts

Certifications

References

David Gilmour video albums
2002 video albums
Live video albums
2002 live albums
Films directed by David Mallet (director)